Galen Hooks is an American dancer, choreographer, creative director, producer, singer/songwriter, and actress.

Work
Hooks is an MTV Video Music Awards-nominated choreographer and dancer who has worked with over sixty artists, including Janet Jackson, Justin Bieber, Ne-Yo,Britney Spears, Kylie Minogue, Usher, Mýa, Chris Brown, The Jonas Brothers, William Chan, Miley Cyrus, Rihanna, Banks, Sunmi, Grimes, and John Legend.  She modelled for Nike's Dance and Sport Culture lines, including catalogues, billboards, and a two-page ad in Vogue magazine.

Producing credits include America's Got Talent (Associate Consulting Producer), The Voice (Associate Performance Producer), Disney Channel Presents: Radio Disney's Family VIP Birthday (Executive Producer, Creative Director), and YouTube's Masterclass (Consulting Producer and Host). Theatre work includes Associate Co-choreographer for the revival of the Broadway show Dreamgirls  and choreographer for the musical Higher Education.

Hooks is a dancer, choreographer, and actress in The Legion of Extraordinary Dancers. She worked for Miguel ("Arch N Point"), Usher ("Good Kisser"), and served as a dancer, choreographer, and actress for Ne-Yo's concept album Libra Scale, in which she played the lead character Diamond Eye and her alter ego, Pretti Sinclair, in the album's music videos, album leaflet and live performances.

More recently, Hooks has garnered fame for YouTube videos featuring her original choreography, including "River," "Love on the Brain," "Human," "i love you," and "Best Part," all racking up over 300 million views. Her choreography emphasizes empowerment, storytelling (acting and intention), and individualism.

Hooks has directed two critically-acclaimed short films, Wait for Me and There Once Was a Woman, which she also produced, choreographed, costumed, edited, and for which she wrote original music.

Additional songwriting includes "Tuesday," "Honey," "Burn," and "Mercy. She has released songs with her music group CAMPFIRE VAUDEVILLE.

Awards
Galen was MTV VMA-nominated for her work on Camila Cabello's "HAVANA," for which she served as Creative Director and one of the choreographers. "HAVANA" has garnered over 900 million views on YouTube.

Galen won the 2019 Dance Icon Award at the Industry Dance Awards, sharing the night with honourees Olivia Newton-John, Jenna Dewan, Derek and Julianne Hough.

Galen received a Choreography Media Honor for her work with Fergie performing "Live and Let Die" on Movies Rock and 6 World Dance Awards for her choreography with THE LXD, YouTube's ReMixed, her own "CAMPFIRE VAUDEVILLE," a song and dance performance featuring original music written by Hooks, and "Wait for Me."  Her YouTube show "Masterclass" (Consulting Producer and Host) was honored by the Webby Awards and Streamy Awards.

Activism/Education
Galen Hooks served as the chair of the Dancers Alliance for ten years and as a board member of SAG-AFTRA. She spearheaded the unionization of music videos and worked with Choreographers Alliance. Hooks is the founder of THE GALEN HOOKS METHOD, transformational intensives for various, focusing on limited class sizes and direct feedback. She also teaches standalone dance classes across the US and internationally. During lockdown, Hooks began offering her classes and events digitally.

Hooks also hosts Nights of Dance, which feature back-to-back classes, and Freestyle Roulette, "a dance event for dancers of any style to showcase their artistic abilities in a high-stakes, supportive environment" that rewards creativity. Dancers are randomly assigned a song and dramatic prompt on the spot before immediately interpreting the prompt.

References

External links
 

1985 births
American choreographers
American female dancers
American women choreographers
Living people
21st-century American women